Caldon Low Halt railway station was a railway station near the hamlet of Cauldon, Staffordshire. It was opened by the North Staffordshire Railway (NSR) in 1905 and closed in 1935.

Construction and opening 
The single line branch was authorised on 1 March 1899 by the Leek, Caldon Low, and Hartington Light Railways Order, 1898, and construction took until 1905.

Station layout 
The station was solely for the use of workmen from the nearby Caldon Low quarries, and their families. There were no goods facilities, just a single wooden platform for passengers with an old coach body to act as an waiting room.  The halt a request stop and was unstaffed with passengers paying for their tickets at their destination.  The only exception to this was on Leek market days when a porter from  would walk to Caldon Low to issue tickets.

Closure 
The branch line was never a financial success and the halt closed on 30 September 1935 when passenger services on the line were withdrawn.

Route

Notes

References 
 
 
 
 

Disused railway stations in Staffordshire
Railway stations in Great Britain opened in 1905
Railway stations in Great Britain closed in 1935
Former North Staffordshire Railway stations
Staffordshire Moorlands